Gerhardus Marinus Maria Nijboer (born 18 August 1955) is a former Dutch long-distance runner. Nijboer competed in three consecutive Summer Olympics, starting in 1980 (Moscow, Soviet Union), when he won the silver medal in the marathon. He became European champion in the marathon in 1982, for which he was named Dutch Sportsman of the year.

His personal best time was 2:09:01 at the Amsterdam Marathon of 26 April 1980, which was at the time the second best marathon ever (after Derek Clayton's 2:08:34 run in 1969).

Notes

References

1955 births
Living people
Dutch male marathon runners
Dutch male long-distance runners
Athletes (track and field) at the 1980 Summer Olympics
Athletes (track and field) at the 1984 Summer Olympics
Athletes (track and field) at the 1988 Summer Olympics
European Athletics Championships medalists
Olympic athletes of the Netherlands
Olympic silver medalists for the Netherlands
World Athletics Championships athletes for the Netherlands
People from Zwartewaterland
Medalists at the 1980 Summer Olympics
Olympic silver medalists in athletics (track and field)
Sportspeople from Overijssel
20th-century Dutch people